Cycling competitions at the 2019 Pan American Games in Lima, Peru were held at five venues across Lima. The Circuito BMX held the BMX racing competitions, the Pista de skateboarding held the freestyle BMX events. Morro Solar staged the mountain biking competitions, and the Circuito San Miguel staged the road competitions. Finally the velodrome staged the track cycling competitions.

The BMX competitions started on August 7 and finished on the 11th (the last of the games), while mountain biking started on the 28th of July. Road cycling competitions started on the 7th and 10th of August. Track cycling competitions were held between August 1st and 4th. 

In 2016, the International Olympic Committee (IOC) made several changes to its sports program, which were subsequently implemented for these games. Included in this was the addition of the BMX freestyle event for the first time to the Pan American Games sports program. Also added was the addition of the Madison event in track cycling for men and women.

22 medal events were contested, four in BMX, two in mountain biking and four in road cycling and 12 in track cycling. Each discipline was gender neutral in terms of events. A total of 250 cyclists qualified to compete at the games.

Competition schedule

The following is the competition schedule for the Cycling competitions:

Medal table

Medal table

Medalists

BMX

BMX freestyle

Mountain biking

Road cycling

Track cycling

  Njisane Phillip of Trinidad and Tobago originally won the silver medal, but was disqualified for doping.
  Trinidad and Tobago team originally won gold medals but was disqualified due to anti-doping rules violation by Njisane Phillip. Brazilian team originally won bronze medals but was disqualified due to anti-doping rules violation by Kacio Fonseca.

Qualification

A total of 250 (143 men and 107 women) cyclists will qualify to compete. 160 will qualify in road/track, 34 in mountain biking and 56 in BMX. Various events and rankings were used to determine the qualifiers. A nation could enter a maximum of 26 athletes, four in mountain biking (two per gender), six in BMX (three per gender) and a combined 16 for road and track (ten men and six women). Peru as host nation, was automatically awarded the maximum quota of 26 spots.

See also
Cycling at the 2020 Summer Olympics

References

External links
Results book – Cycling – BMX
Results book – Cycling – Mountain biking
Results book – Cycling – Road
Results book – Cycling – Track

 
Events at the 2019 Pan American Games
Pan American Games
Pan American Games
Pan American Games
2019
2019 in mountain biking
2019 in BMX